The Red Rider (German: Der rote Reiter) is a 1923 German silent film directed by Franz W. Koebner and starring Fern Andra, Albert Steinrück and Carola Toelle. It premiered at the Marmorhaus in Berlin. It is based on the 1922 novel of the same title by Franz Xaver Kappus, later adapted into a 1935 sound film The Red Rider.

Cast
 Fern Andra 
 Albert Steinrück 
 Carola Toelle 
 Hans Junkermann 
 Julius Falkenstein 
 Ferdinand von Alten 
 Ludwig Salm 
 Ilka Grüning 
 Arnold Korff 
 Frida Richard 
 Kurt Bobeth-Bolander
 Fritz Schulz

References

Bibliography
 Grange, William. Cultural Chronicle of the Weimar Republic. Scarecrow Press, 2008.

External links

1923 films
Films of the Weimar Republic
German silent feature films
German black-and-white films